Moss Rose is a 1934 mystery novel by the British writer Marjorie Bowen, written under the pen name of Joseph Shearing. It is based on the unsolved murder of Harriet Buswell in 1872. The title refers to Moss Rose, a flowering plant.

Adaptations
It was adapted into the 1947 film Moss Rose directed by Gregory Ratoff and starring Peggy Cummins, Victor Mature and Ethel Barrymore.

References

Bibliography
 Goble, Alan. The Complete Index to Literary Sources in Film. Walter de Gruyter, 1999.
 Vinson, James. Twentieth-Century Romance and Gothic Writers. Macmillan, 1982.

1934 British novels
Novels set in London
British novels adapted into films
British mystery novels
British thriller novels
Novels by Marjorie Bowen
Novels set in the 19th century
Heinemann (publisher) books